Shervington is a surname. Notable people with the surname include:

Ed Shervington (born 1986), Welsh rugby union player
Pluto Shervington (born 1950), Jamaican reggae musician, singer, engineer, and producer
Tyrell Mildmay Shervington (born 1892), British oil company executive

See also 

 Jessica Shirvington (born 1979), Australian author
 Matt Shirvington (born 1978), Australian sprinter